Marcus Hook station (formerly known as Linwood) is a station along the SEPTA Wilmington/Newark Line and Amtrak's Northeast Corridor in Marcus Hook, Pennsylvania. Amtrak does not stop here; the station is only served by SEPTA. Many locals continue on to Wilmington and Newark. However, some trains terminate at this station. Located at 12th & Washington Streets, the station has a 147-space parking lot. The line offers southbound service to Wilmington and Newark, Delaware and northbound service to Philadelphia.

Marcus Hook station was originally built by the Pennsylvania Railroad in 1875, replaced in 1893. That station depot was razed in February 1963. Two other Baltimore and Ohio Railroad stations also used to exist in the Borough.

Station layout
Marcus Hook has two low-level side platforms with walkways connecting passengers to the inner tracks. Amtrak's Northeast Corridor lines bypass the station via the inner tracks.

See also
Bell Tower (PRR)

References

External links

SEPTA – Marcus Hook Station
 Market Street entrance from Google Maps Street View

SEPTA Regional Rail stations
Stations on the Northeast Corridor
Railway stations in Delaware County, Pennsylvania
Railway stations in the United States opened in 1875
Railway stations in the United States opened in 1893
Wilmington/Newark Line